The Jerusalem Forest is a municipal pine forest located in the Judean Mountains on the outskirts of Jerusalem. It is surrounded by the neighborhoods of Beit HaKerem, Yefe Nof, Ein Kerem, Har Nof and Givat Shaul, and a moshav, Beit Zeit. The forest was planted during the 1950s by the Jewish National Fund, financed by private donors.

History

In the early years of the state, Jewish National Fund planted thousands of trees along the western edge of Jerusalem, creating a green belt.

The first tree of the Jerusalem Forest was planted in 1956 by the second President of Israel, Itzhak Ben-Zvi. At its peak, the area of the forest covered 4,700 dunams (470 hectares). Over the years, the boundaries of the forest have receded due to urban expansion, and it now covers only 1,250 dunams (125 hectares).

The Yad Vashem Holocaust museum is located in the forest below Mount Herzl. In the middle of the forest, between Yad Vashem and Ein Kerem, is Mercaz Tzippori, a youth hostel. On this same campus is the office of "The Adam Institute for Democracy and Peace", an Israeli non-profit organization that runs educational programs promoting tolerance and coexistence.

The forest acts as a refuge for wildlife, and there are packs of jackals that inhabit the forest.

Conservation efforts
Projects by the Jerusalem Municipality such as the planned Jerusalem Road 16 threaten the continued existence of the forest, which causes concern among environmental organizations and residents of Jerusalem, especially those living in the nearby neighborhoods. At the end of the 1990s, environmental organizations and residents organized to fight for the future of the forest and its protection.

See also
List of forests in Israel
Eshtaol Forest
Wildlife of Israel
Yatir Forest

References

External links

Website of the Tzippori Center (Hebrew)

Forests of Israel
Geography of Jerusalem
Jewish National Fund forests and parks
Protected areas of Jerusalem District
Urban forests